DYNJ (98.3 FM) is a relay station of RJFM Manila, owned and operated by Rajah Broadcasting Network through its licensee Free Air Broadcasting Network, Inc. The station's transmitter is located along JM Basa St. corner Mapa St., Iloilo City.

History
The station was established in 1974 as DYRJ on 1152 kHz. At that time, it was located in Nabitasan, La Paz District. In 1980, it transferred to FM via 98.7 MHz and was dubbed as The Flava of The City. In 1990, it adopted the RJFM brand and switched to an album rock format. In 1996, it transferred to 98.3 MHz and changed its name to Boss Radio. In 2000, it rebranded as The Hive and switched to a modern rock format. In 2003, it became a relay station of RJ 100. In July 2009, it transferred its transmitter facilities to Casa Plaza Bldg.

References

External links
RJFM FB Page

Radio stations in Iloilo City
Radio stations established in 1974